Gynandromyia longicornis is a Chinese species of tachinid flies in the genus Gynandromyia of the family Tachinidae.

References

Diptera of Africa
Insects described in 1992
Exoristinae